The 1955 Sam Houston State Bearkats football team was an American football team that represented Sam Houston State Teachers College—now known as Sam Houston State University–as a member of the Lone Star Conference (LSC) during the 1955 college football season. Led by fourth-year head coach Paul Pierce, the Bearkats compiled an overall record of 6–1–2 with a mark of 5–1 in conference play, sharing the LSC title with East Texas State and Southwest Texas State.

Schedule

References

Sam Houston State
Sam Houston Bearkats football seasons
Lone Star Conference football champion seasons
Sam Houston State Bearkats football